Grass Hills National Park is a protected area in the Western Ghats, India, and a part of the Anamalai Tiger Reserve, forming its boundary with Eravikulam National Park in neighbouring Kerala state. It is not an actual National Park. It spreads over 65,000 hectares. The landscape is a combination of peaks and high plateaus above  MSL composed of montane shola-grassland ecosystem that is unique to the higher ranges of the Western Ghats of Kerala and Tamil Nadu.

The important peaks are, Attuparai kurukku top(6662 ft), Oosi malai Theri, kazhuku chutti malai, silve medu. It is primarily a shola grassland eco system.

References

National parks in Tamil Nadu
South Western Ghats montane rain forests
Protected areas with year of establishment missing